Maisonette or Maisonettes may refer to:

 Maisonette, a type of apartment
 The Maisonette, a former restaurant in Cincinnati, Ohio, United States
 The Maisonettes, an English band

See also 
 Maison (disambiguation)
 Maisonnette (disambiguation)